Stanley John Ambrose Cotterell (1857–1939) founded the Bicycle Touring Club at Harrogate, Yorkshire, on 5 August 1878, while he was a medical student. Its headquarters were wherever he happened to be living. By 1883, the Bicycle Touring Club was renamed the Cyclists' Touring Club to open membership to tricyclists.

Cotterell was born in 1857 in Ilfracombe, Devon, and studied medicine in Edinburgh. One of Cotterell's earliest tasks at the Cyclists Touring Club was to set up the first network of hotels. He enlisted members' help and appointed regional officials such that by 1881 he had 785 establishments under contract with the CTC, offering fixed tariffs, reserved rooms and exclusive lounges for cyclists to use.

Commemoration

The Golden Book

Stanley Cotterell's achievements were celebrated in 1938 when Cycling Weekly awarded him his own page in the Golden Book of Cycling, which is now held in 'The Pedal Club' archive. Cotterell who was the first member was photographed with Mrs Jeanie Welford who was the first female member.

CTC 75th anniversary

In 1953, to commemorate the 75th anniversary of the Cyclists Touring Club, Cotterell's foundation ride from Edinburgh to Harrogate on a 'High Ordinary' bicycle was re-enacted.  Additionally a commemorative plaque was unveiled in Harrogate.

Cotterell House

In 1966	the National Headquarters of the Cyclists Touring Club moved to 'Cotterell House', 69 Meadrow, Godalming, Surrey. This building was subsequently sold and redeveloped.

References

1857 births
1939 deaths
English male cyclists
Cycling journalists
People from Ilfracombe
Alumni of the University of Edinburgh
19th-century English medical doctors
20th-century English medical doctors